The 2004 Family Circle Cup was a women's tennis tournament and the 32nd edition of the Family Circle Cup.  This WTA Tier I Event was held on outdoor clay courts at the Family Circle Tennis Center in Charleston, South Carolina, United States. Fourth-seeded Venus Williams won the singles title.

Finals

Singles

 Venus Williams defeated  Conchita Martínez 2–6, 6–2, 6–1

Doubles

 Virginia Ruano Pascual /  Paola Suárez defeated  Martina Navratilova /  Lisa Raymond 6–4, 6–1

External links
 WTA tournament draws
 ITF tournament draws

Family Circle Cup
Charleston Open
Family Circle Cup
Family Circle Cup
Family Circle Cup